Susan Jane Aitchison  is an English television actress best known for her role as Susie on Jam & Jerusalem. She is the daughter of June Whitfield.

Life 
She graduated from the University of Birmingham with a degree in Drama & Theatre Arts. After working extensively in theatre, her mother put her in touch with Jennifer Saunders. Aitchison subsequently worked with Saunders on a French/Saunders Christmas Special, before being offered the part on Jam & Jerusalem. Aitchison also featured in several stage productions and has been praised for her performances. Previously, her body of television work has largely consisted of guest-starring roles on television programmes. Aitchison has also narrated several audiobooks for the BBC.

Filmography

TV appearances
 Are You Being Served? as Susan
 Honour, Profit and Pleasure (1985)
 Filthy Rich and Catflap, 1986
 The Russ Abbot Show, 1986–1989
 Little and Large
 Mr. Bean
 Casualty
 Absolutely Fabulous as 1970s Nurse in series 2 final episode "Birth"
 The 10 Percenters as Trudy Hackman
 Goodnight Sweetheart
 The Revenge Files of Alistair Fury as Miss Bird
 Jam & Jerusalem as Susie
 Midsomer Murders as Alice in "The Silent Land"

Films
 Bloody New Year as Lesley, 1987

References

External links

Living people
English television actresses
Alumni of the University of Birmingham
Actresses from London
People from Marylebone
English voice actresses
20th-century English actresses
21st-century English actresses
Year of birth missing (living people)